Events from the year 1616 in Denmark.

Incumbents
 Monarch - Christian IV

Events
 March 17 - Danish East India Company receives a monopoly on trade on Danish India.
 November 29 - The first fleet of the Danish East India Company departs from Copenhagen under the command of Ove Gjedde.

Culture
 Johan Friis and Karen Krabbe presents a new pylpit to Otterup Church.

Births
 January 27 or 28 - Christen Aagaard, poet (died 1664)
 October 20 - Thomas Bartholin, physician, mathematician, and theologian (died 1680)

Deaths
 February 13 - Anders Sørensen Vedel, priest and historiographer (born 1542)

References

External links

 
Denmark
Years of the 17th century in Denmark